Judith Mary Edwards (born 10 April 1955) in Beverley, Western Australia is an Australian politician. She was the ALP member of the Western Australian Legislative Assembly from May 1990 to September 2008, representing the electorate of Maylands.

Edwards won preselection for the seat of Maylands following the resignation of Peter Dowding, and entered parliament at the 1990 Maylands by-election. She has subsequently been re-elected four more times in 1993, 1996, 2001 and 2005.

Prior to entering Parliament Edwards was a general practitioner after completing her medical degree from the University of Western Australia.
Once in Parliament Edward was appointed as minister of the environment and heritage from 2001 to 2003, and minister of environment from 2003 to 2006.

Edwards retired in 2008 and Lisa Baker won pre-selection for the seat, eventually winning the seat.

References 

1955 births
Living people
Members of the Western Australian Legislative Assembly
People from Beverley, Western Australia
Australian general practitioners
Australian Labor Party members of the Parliament of Western Australia
21st-century Australian politicians
Women members of the Western Australian Legislative Assembly
21st-century Australian women politicians